Beau Bell may refer to 

 Beau Bell, a fairy in some pantomime productions of Dick Whittington and his Cat.
 Beau Bell (1907 – 1977), American baseball player
 Beau Bell (American football) (b. 1986), American gridiron football player.